Chumuch District is one of twelve districts of the province Celendín in Peru.

References

1862 establishments in Peru